Kanpezu in Basque or Campezo in Spanish is a municipality located in the province of Álava, in the Basque Country, northern Spain.

This municipality lies on the western side of the Codés mountain range.

Villages
 Antoñana
 Bujanda
 Orbiso
 Oteo
Santa Cruz de Campezo / Santikurutze Kanpezu, capital of the Cuadrilla de Campezo-Montaña Alavesa comarca and main town of the municipality

External links

 CAMPEZO in the Bernardo Estornés Lasa - Auñamendi Encyclopedia 

Municipalities in Álava